Two ships of the Royal Navy have been named HMS Ostrich, after the bird:

 was a 14-gun sloop purchased in 1777 and sold in 1782.
 was a  launched in 1900 and sold in 1920.

Royal Navy ship names